Yucuquimi de Ocampo is a small town in the municipality of Tezoatlán de Segura y Luna, in the Huajuapan District of the Mixteca Baja region, in the state of Oaxaca, Mexico. Yucuquimi de Ocampo is home to a population of Mixtec people, many of whom still speak the Mixtec language.

History
Yucuquimi de Ocampo's history dates back to pre-Hispanic times.

In September 2019, political conflict arose in the town, with municipal agent Eloina León Vázquez having claimed the government had failed to deliver money and resources that had been promised to the town. The town declared the intent to become an autonomous municipality due to this issue and claims of discrimination and indifference from the state and municipal governments, and inhabitants of the town along with members of the Zapatistas set up a blockade on Federal Highway 190, claiming they would keep the blockade in place until an agreement was reached. Shortly after, forces of the National Guard were sent to the town and surrounding Tezoatlán de Segura y Luna municipality in order to restore government control.

Name
Yucuquimi de Ocampo's name is derived from the Mixtec phrase yucuquini which is officially translated as "cerro del lucero" in Spanish and roughly means "mountain of the morning star" in English. Many municipal vehicles in Yucuquimi de Ocampo also display the phrase "cerro del lucero" along with an image of a mountain with bright star hovering just above the summit.

Geography
Yucuquimi de Ocampo is located in the mountains of the Mixteca Baja region.

Barrios
Yucuquimi de Ocampo is made up of five "barrios" or neighborhoods:
 Alta Vista
 Buenos Aires
 Plan de Iguala
 Centro
 Barrio Juarez

Each neighborhood has its own primary school and church building. Centro also holds the town's municipal building and town square were many cultural events are held each year.

Demographics

Population

Yucuquimi de Ocampo has a population of 2,260 inhabitants according to data from the INEGI Population and Housing Census of 2010. Of these, 1,024 are men and 1,236 are women.

Language
Many of the inhabitants of Yucuquimi de Ocampo are Mixtec. The Mixtec Language, specifically Mixteco de Tezoatlán, is spoken by about 86% of the population, according to one estimate. Spanish is also widely spoken here and is officially taught in the schools.

Community life
Yucuquimi de Ocampo is an agricultural community. Many of the town's inhabitants plant corn when the rainy season starts in late May or early June. While a few people have had their fields plowed by a tractor in recent years, the majority still make their own plows and use working animals. The corn is harvested in November and the dried corn stalks are used as feed for the animals. After the corn is harvested, it is stored in large sacks and used to make masa for tortillas.

Arts and culture
Many of Yucuquimi de Ocampo's inhabitants are skilled artisans, specializing in making articles out of dried palm leaves (see Basket weaving). The people commonly make such things as floor mats, baskets, hats, ropes, fire fans and toys.

Recreation
Basketball has become very popular among the youth of Yucuquimi de Ocampo in recent years. As a result, there are many public basketball courts around town. The local schools even form basketball teams and play against other schools in the area.

Infrastructure
Yucuquimi de Ocampo is mostly made up of dirt roads. There is only one paved road that connects it with other small towns nearby; San Andrés Yutatío to the North and San Marcos de Garzón to the West. The paved rode passes through the Buenos Aires neighborhood.

References

External links
 FOTOGRAFÍAS DE YUCUQUIMI DE OCAMPO, pictures of Yucuquimi de Ocampo and the area 
  YUCUQUIMI DE OCAMPO -- CERRO DEL LUCERO--, pictures of Yucuquimi de Ocampo and history 

Populated places in Oaxaca